Ilian Mihov (born 1966, Samokov, Bulgaria) is a Bulgarian economist and the Dean and the Rausing Chaired Professor of Economic and Business Transformation at INSEAD.

Early life
Mihov was born in 1966 in Samokov, Bulgaria. He graduated from the University of South Carolina's Moore School of Business and he earned a PhD in economics from Princeton University, where his thesis supervisor was Ben Bernanke. He joined INSEAD in 1996 and has served as its Dean INSEAD as of 2013.

Career
Mihov has published research in macroeconomic questions, especially regarding monetary policy, fiscal policy, and economic growth. He is a fellow of the Center for Economic Policy Research.

In 2010, after serving as an economic adviser to the Bulgarian Government, he was appointed by Bulgarian Prime Minister Boyko Borisov to be Bulgaria's Deputy Prime Minister in charge of Bulgaria's efforts to join the Eurozone and of coordinating EU funding, but never took up the position. He has been a member of the Scientific Committee of the Banque de France's Research Foundation, the Advisory Board of the Bulgarian National Bank, and the World Economic Forum’s Global Agenda Council.

In 2018, Mihov was recognized as a HeForShe Leader by the UN Women Singapore Committee.

Personal life
Mihov currently resides in Singapore.

References

Living people
People from Samokov
University of South Carolina alumni
Princeton University alumni
20th-century Bulgarian economists
Bulgarian politicians
Academic staff of INSEAD
Bulgarian expatriates in Singapore
Business school deans
1966 births
Bulgarian academic administrators
20th-century Bulgarian educators
21st-century Bulgarian educators
21st-century Bulgarian economists